Altheides (1193–1262) was a Cypriot philosopher, primarily known from sayings attributed to him in the works of others. Little is known about the wandering philosopher known as Altheides of Cyprus, and little of his work remains available to modern scholars. His parents were Greek merchants living on the island under the rule of Guy of Lusignan. He was born a year before Guy's death, in 1193. At some point in his late teens he left Cyprus as a seaman on a Moorish trading vessel.

Altheides the philosopher

Altheides again turns up in historical records with the founding of his School of Philosophy in Jerusalem in 1226, under the rule of al-Kamil, the nephew of Saladin and ruler of Jerusalem. His school was never particularly successful, and dispersed shortly after al-Kamil's treaty of 1229 signing the city back over to the Crusaders. From this point very little is known. Scattered accounts and writings appear here and there in as varied locations as Spain, Morocco, Rome, and Egypt. Altheides died near his childhood home on Cyprus in 1262.

Works
Altheides never wrote a serious philosophical work or treatise and is primarily known for his many wise sayings, primarily found in other works written in the early thirteenth century.

We are running towards a precipice; we can but hope that when we reach the edge we shall be able to fly. [Of education and training, Jerusalem, 1227]
If anyone asks you if you can do something, have only two answers: 'yes' and 'not yet.' [Jerusalem, 1227]
A clever man is capable of solving puzzles, and a knowledgeable man knows many answers. But only a wise man knows which puzzles to solve and which questions to ask. [Of human perception of intelligence, Athens, 1236]
Life is full of boundaries; a life lived within them is a life not worth living at all. [Athens, unknown year]

References

1193 births
1262 deaths
13th-century philosophers
Cypriot writers
13th-century Greek people